Helicobacter muridarum is a bacterium in the Helicobacteraceae family, Campylobacterales order. It is microaerophilic and helical and was first isolated from the intestinal mucosa of rodents, hence its name. It is characterised by the presence of 9 to 11 periplasmic fibers which appear as concentric helical ridges on the surface of each cell. The cells are motile and have bipolar tufts of 10 to 14 sheathed flagella. These bacteria are nutritionally fastidious and physiologically similar to other Helicobacter species and Wolinella succinogenes, but can be differentiated from these organisms by their unique cellular ultrastructure. ST1T (= ATCC 49282T) is its type strain.

References

Further reading

External links

Type strain of Helicobacter muridarum at BacDive -  the Bacterial Diversity Metadatabase

Campylobacterota
Bacteria described in 1992